Eupoca chicalis is a moth in the family Crambidae. It was described by William Schaus in 1920. It is found from Guatemala south-east to French Guiana.

References

Glaphyriinae
Moths described in 1920